Spider Glacier is in Wenatchee National Forest in the U.S. state of Washington and is to the north of Spider Mountain. Spider Glacier is separated by an arête from Middle Cascade Glacier to the west.

This Spider Glacier is not to be confused with another of the same name nearby, Spider Glacier (Phelps Ridge, Washington).

See also
List of glaciers in the United States

References

Glaciers of the North Cascades
Glaciers of Chelan County, Washington
Glaciers of Washington (state)